Yingguo is a town in eastern Henan province, China, near the border with Anhui province. It is under the administration of Yucheng County.

References 

Township-level divisions of Henan
Yucheng County